Bon Jovi Live was the fourteenth concert tour by American band, Bon Jovi. Visiting several countries in North America and Europe, the tour supported the band's sixth compilation album, The Greatest Hits. It follows The Circle Tour, which became the biggest tour of 2010. At the conclusion of 2011, the tour placed second on Billboard's annual, "Top 25 Tour", earning over $190 million with 68 shows.

Background
In October 2010, Bon Jovi released the concert film, "The Circle Tour: Live From Jersey" in U.S. theaters. At the same time, the band announced the release of their latest greatest hits collection and their upcoming tour. Upon the release of the album, the new tour dates were announced as well. While touring Australia, it was announced that the "Circle Tour" became the biggest tour of 2010, grossing over $200 million. Commenting on the tour, Jon Bon Jovi stated,"You can show up, but that doesn't mean the people are going to go, and that doesn't mean they're going to come the next time and the next time. […] The year's not over yet. I need to make it to July 31 and then look back. If it were over right now, I'd look back on the Circle run and happily say, 'Wow, it was a good year. I was unbelievably healthy, we did great business, we got along.' But it's not over. It's just the beginning of the third quarter, we've just taken the field. So I won't look back until we get to the end zone."

On April 28, 2011 it was announced that Richie Sambora would be absent from some shows enter rehabilitation for exhaustion and alcoholism, but the tour will continue with the rest of the band. Sambora was replaced by Canadian guitarist Theofilos Xenidis (known professionally as Phil X), beginning on April 30, 2011. On 6 June 2011, it was announced that Sambora would rejoin Bon Jovi for the remainder of the tour. In June 2011 Bon Jovi played two nights in the RDS Arena, Dublin, Ireland, performing to an audience of over 34,000 each night.

On June 17, 2011, Jon suffered an MCL strain in his left knee while performing "Love's the only Rule" at the Helsinki, Finland concert. The incident was caught on a YouTube video and the pain he endured was quite obvious. It occurred in the first set about an hour into the show. Nine days later, he had surgery in Dublin, Ireland and played the Dublin show and several others with a knee brace. No shows were cancelled during this incident.

Set list
Raise Your Hands
You Give Love a Bad Name
Born to Be My Baby
We Weren't Born to Follow
Lost Highway
It's My Life
Runaway
The More Things Change
We Got It Going On
Captain Crash & The Beauty Queen From Mars
Bad Medicine (with snippets of Oh, Pretty Woman)
Lay Your Hands on Me (Richie Sambora on lead vocals)
When We Were Beautiful
Bed of Roses
I'll Be There for You
Who Says You Can't Go Home
I'll Sleep When I'm Dead (with snippets of Start Me Up)
Someday I'll Be Saturday Night
Have a Nice Day
Keep the Faith
Encore;
In These Arms
Wanted Dead or Alive
Blood on Blood
Livin' on a Prayer

Shows

Personnel
Band
Jon Bon Jovi - lead vocals, guitar, maracas for Keep the Faith, tambourine for Hey God
Richie Sambora – lead guitar, lead vocals for Lay Your Hands on Me, backing vocals, talkbox
Hugh McDonald – bass, backing vocals
Tico Torres - drums, percussion, backing vocals for Love for Sale
David Bryan - keyboards, backing vocals

Additional musicians
Bobby Bandiera – rhythm guitar, backing vocals
Phil X – lead guitar, backing vocals, talkbox (substitute for Richie Sambora from April 30 to May 22)

Notes

References

Bon Jovi concert tours
2011 concert tours